Ruscombe is a historic home located at Baltimore, Maryland, United States. It is a -story Italianate mansion with basement, constructed of fieldstone in 1866. It is a gable and hip roofed building.  The main block of the building is 50 feet by 50 feet, with a gable-roofed L-shaped wing. It was designed by Baltimore architect Joseph F. Kemp, who is credited with the design of Camden Station.

Ruscombe was listed on the National Register of Historic Places in 2007.

References

External links
 at Maryland Historical Trust

Houses on the National Register of Historic Places in Baltimore
Houses in Baltimore
Houses completed in 1866
Italianate architecture in Maryland
1866 establishments in Maryland
Northern Baltimore